Halanzy (Gaumais: Halazi;) is a village of Wallonia and a district of the municipality of Aubange, located in the province of Luxembourg, Belgium.

The history of Halanzy is connected to the mining of iron ore in the area. A memorial of its past as a mining town is the preserved early steam locomotive in the town centre. The village church dates from 1844, and there is also a chapel built in 1725 in gratitude for the village being spared from the cholera epidemy in 1720. Similarly, a calvary group in the village was erected to celebrate that the village was spared destruction during World War I.

References

External links

Former municipalities of Luxembourg (Belgium)